The Neverending Story is an animated television series, produced by CineVox Entertainment and animated by Ellipse Animation and Canadian Nelvana Limited. It aired for one season (1995–1996) on HBO, and ran for 26 episodes. In Canada, it also aired on Family Channel. The series is loosely based on Michael Ende's book, The Neverending Story (1979).

Plot
A young boy named Bastian helps yet again the Childlike Empress and her people of Fantasia, an imagination land that can be accessed and influenced through a magic neverending book called The Neverending Story, because the horrifying Nothing and other villains like the evil sorceress Xayide still threaten it. In the process, Bastian learns valuable lessons and gains many magical friends like the wooden Bark Troll, the luckdragon Falkor and many others.

Differences between the TV series and the film
In the animated series, the Nothing is a recurring villain. The Nothing is portrayed as a hole with evil red eyes, which belongs to that of a white wolf, and is the television version of Gmork. The evil sorceress Xayide, unlike in the first sequel film, wears green robes with an eye mask with yellow slits. In the original film, her face is created by a special magical cream. The Rockbiter, in the latter two sequel films (including the third film), actually has a wife and a son, Junior. His wife and son appear in the series as well.

Cast and characters
 Janet-Laine Green as Xayide
 Dominic Zamprogna as Atreyu
 Chris Wiggins as Carl Conrad Coreander
 Christopher Bell as Bastian Balthazar Bux
 Neil Crone as Nimbly
 Marilyn Lightstone as Ygramul
 Benedict Campbell as Shadow Goblin
 John McGrath as Blubb
 Lisa Yamanaka as The Childlike Empress, Junior Rockbiter
 Richard Binsley as Barktroll
 James Rankin as Three Head
 John Stocker as Gluckuk, Gluckuk's racing snail
 Colin Fox as Large Head
 Pam Hyatt as Morla
 Ellen Ray Hennessy as Southern Oracle
 Dan Hennessey as South Wind Giant
 Gary Krawford as Graograman the fire lion
 Howard Jerome as Falkor the luckdragon
 Don Francks as Gmork
 Wayne Robson as Engywook
 Barbara Byrne as Urgl
 Len Carlson as Vermin
 Geoffrey Bowes as Barney Bux
 Harvey Atkin as Rockbiter, Mr. Rockchewer
 Jayne Eastwood as Mrs. Rockchewer

Episodes

Telecast and home media
The Neverending Story was first aired on HBO in 1995 until 1996. Repeats were aired on HBO's sister channel until 2005. In Canada, it also aired on Family Channel. Internationally, the show was aired on Nickelodeon (UK and Latin America), Canal+ (France) and Kindernet (The Netherlands).
 In 1996, a single episode of "The Neverending Story: The Animated Adventures of Bastian Balthazar Bux" was released by HBO Home Entertainment (under HBO Kids Video branch).
 In 2005, the first three episodes of The Neverending Story: The Animated Adventures were released on DVD by FUNimation Entertainment, LTD. (under its Our Time Family Entertainment children's/pre-school entertainment label) in a compilation entitled "Bastian to the Rescue".
 As of 2022, all episodes were currently available on Amazon Prime.

References

External links
 

1990s Canadian animated television series
1995 Canadian television series debuts
1996 Canadian television series endings
1990s French animated television series
1995 French television series debuts
1996 French television series endings
1990s German animated television series
1995 German television series debuts
1996 German television series endings
1990s British children's television series
1995 British television series debuts
1996 British television series endings
British children's animated adventure television series
British children's animated fantasy television series
Canadian children's animated adventure television series
Canadian children's animated fantasy television series
French children's animated adventure television series
French children's animated fantasy television series
German children's animated adventure television series
German children's animated fantasy television series
HBO original programming
Family Channel (Canadian TV network) original programming
ProSieben original programming
Works based on The Neverending Story
English-language television shows
German-language television shows
British television shows based on children's books
Canadian television shows based on children's books
French television shows based on children's books
Animated television series about children
Television series by Nelvana
Canal+ original programming